Cephalophyllum confusum is a species of plant in the family Aizoaceae. It is endemic to Namibia.

References

Flora of Namibia
confusum
Least concern plants
Taxonomy articles created by Polbot
Taxa named by Kurt Dinter